G. S. Brown was an Irish rugby union international. He won three caps in 1912.

References
G. S. Brown at Scrum.com
IRFU Profile

Year of birth missing
Year of death missing
Irish rugby union players
Ireland international rugby union players
Monkstown Football Club players
Missing middle or first names
Rugby union props